"Kimi wa 1000%" (Japanese: 君は1000%, English: "You are 1000%") is a song recorded by the Japanese city pop and soft rock band, 1986 Omega Tribe, released on May 1, 1986, by  VAP. It is the song most commonly identified with Omega Tribe when Carlos Toshiki was the lead vocalist. The song peaked at #6 on the Oricon charts.

Background 
After passing an audition for the band, Carlos Toshiki, a Japanese Brazilian singer, was invited by producer Koichi Fujita to go to Hawaii, saying, "I want to go to Hawaii together because I want to know more about Carlos." After spending some time with Fujita in Hawaii, Fujita asked if there were any similar pronunciations in Portuguese and Japanese. Carlos replied that in Japanese, "1000" was pronounced "sen" (千) and in Portuguese, "100" was pronounced "cem." Fujita found it interesting, and contacted Masako Arikawa, asking if she could write a song based on the similar pronunciations and with the title "Kimi wa 1000%."

The song was used as the opening for the Nippon TV drama, "Shin Netchū Jidai Sengen," starring Ikue Sakakibara.

Night Tempo remix 

In 2019, Korean future funk producer Night Tempo remixed the song as a part of his Showa Groove series. The remix is the third to be featured in the series, previously remixing Anri and Wink.

Night Tempo chose the song as the band was formed the same year he was born (1986) as well as it being a popular song in the Western city pop and future funk scenes. To commemorate the release, Night Tempo edited the music video himself, which released on November 7, 2019, on his YouTube channel. Night Tempo played the song in the 2019 Fuji Rock Festival, also playing the song on Radio Nikkei during the radio program Music Night.

With the release, Night Tempo announced a tour in Japan in six cities. The performances that were announced in Tokyo and Osaka sold out in the same day.

Cover versions

Reggae version 
In 1995, an English-language reggae version of the song called "Kimi wa 1000% (Tell Me We'll Meet Again)" was performed by Reggae Tribe as a part of their album, Kimi wa Reggae 1000%. The album is a cover album of Kiyotaka Sugiyama & Omega Tribe songs as well as 1986 Omega Tribe songs. The album was released by Cutting Edge in Japan and by Telstar Records in the UK. The song and album were produced by Max Matsuura, the CEO of the Avex Group, with translated lyrics by Tommy Snyder and vocals by Joey Johnson.

Yuko Ando version 
In 2006, Japanese singer Yuio Ando covered the song on her sixth studio album, The Still Steel Down. Ando stated that she felt depresses when reading the lyrics, and thought that she could express it in a more melancholic way. Ando also said that she tried to imitate both Toshiki and Koji Tamaki while singing, imitating Tamaki for a "more depressed feeling" and pronouncing the "R's" in the song as strongly as Toshiki did. The drums are played by Yasuo Sano, who is most famous for being a drummer for the Seatbelts. He uses a half-time shuffle for the drums, adding to the song's jazzy atmosphere.

The cover was also included in the 2011 compilation album, Otona No Majime na Cover Series.

Nishikawa Shigeomi version 
In 2007, singer-songwriter Nishikawa Shigeomi covered the song as a part of the compilation album, 80's Hit Parade, Vol. 1. The cover has been called a "must-listen for his clear singing voice and beautiful high tones".

Toyono version 
In 2016, singer Toyono covered the song on her album Kurokami No Samba. Toyono decided to cover the song after singing it live for a crowd, who reacted positively to it. She was initially confused as she though the lyrics were all in Portuguese, as well as how to cover it with only a guitar, but ultimately recorded it. She said in an interview that she and the mixing engineer were both happy with how the song turned out. The album was the first one in six years from Toyono, and was released by Victor Entertainment. The song has been described as a "wonderful interpretation that quietly expresses the passion of this song."

Minato Kaoru version 
In 2017, singer Minato Kaoru (Sarutoki Minagawa) covered the song in his debut album Ore de ī no Kai – Minato Kaoru, Utai Sugiru. Kaoru also performed the song during his 46th Anniversary Concert with his band, Group Tamashii.

EnGene version 
The boyband EnGene released a cover the song as their fourth single on June 1, 2019. The cover was announced on April 17, 2019, on their Twitter. Carlos Toshiki supported the cover, taking a photo with the group wearing merch of the single.

Haretokidoki version 
Tokyo electronic duo Haretokidoki released a cover of the song on August 17, 2022.

Charts

Weekly charts

Year-end charts

References 

1986 songs
Omega Tribe (Japanese band) songs